Nasrabad Rural District is in the Central District of Taft County, Yazd province, Iran. At the National Census of 2006, its population was 3,821 in 1,256 households. There were 5,142 inhabitants in 1,700 households at the following census of 2011. At the most recent census of 2016, the population of the rural district was 3,628 in 1,253 households. The largest of its 160 villages was Nasrabad, with 1,898 people.

References 

Taft County

Rural Districts of Yazd Province

Populated places in Yazd Province

Populated places in Taft County